Washington station is an Amtrak intercity train station in Washington, Missouri, United States.

The brick station was designed for the Missouri Pacific Railroad by the railroad's Chief Engineer E. M. Tucker and built in 1923. The wooden depot built in 1865 which it replaced was moved and became the Missouri Pacific freight station. Both stations still stand.

Future
On November 9, 2022, Amtrak announced that it would be investing $3 million to improve the station. The work will add a new 170-foot platform, new lighting and new signage to the station. The parking lot and the building will remain unchanged.

See also 
List of Amtrak stations

References

External links 

Washington, MO – USA Rail Guide (TrainWeb)

Amtrak stations in Missouri
Railway stations in the United States opened in 1923
Former Missouri Pacific Railroad stations
Buildings and structures in Franklin County, Missouri